The 1966 Hawaii gubernatorial election was Hawaii's third gubernatorial election.  The election was held on November 8, 1966, and resulted in a victory for the Democratic candidate,  incumbent Governor of Hawaii John A. Burns over Republican candidate, State Senator Randolph Crossley.  Despite the close race, Burns received more votes than Crossley in every county in the state except Honolulu, which Crossley won by less than one percentage point.

Primaries
Neither the Democratic nor Republican primaries, both of which were held on October 1, 1966, were particularly contentious.  In the Democratic primary, John A. Burns received 79.49% of the vote to G.J. Fontes' 20.51%.  Randolph Crossley received 98.08% of the Republican primary vote to 1.92% for Gottfried Seitz.

General election

References

1966
1966 United States gubernatorial elections
November 1966 events in the United States
1966 Hawaii elections